The United Pentecostal Council of the Assemblies of God, Incorporated is an African-American Trinitarian Holiness Pentecostal denomination, organized in Massachusetts in 1919.

The UPCAOG is constituted of about 30 congregations in USA and 15 in Barbados.
 

Links:
Website 

Pentecostal denominations
African-American organizations
Holiness denominations